Greenland, an autonomous territory within the Kingdom of Denmark (which also includes the territories of Denmark and Faroe Islands) is one of the EU members’ overseas countries and territories (OCT) associated to the European Union. Greenland receives funding from the EU for sustainable development and has signed agreements increasing cooperation with the EU.

The associated relationship with the EU also means that all citizens of the Realm of Denmark residing in Greenland (Greenlandic nationals) are EU citizens. This allows Greenlanders to move and reside freely within the EU.

Greenland joined the then European Community in 1973 as a county along with Denmark, but after gaining autonomy in 1979 with the introduction of home rule within the Kingdom of Denmark, Greenland voted to leave in 1982 and left in 1985, to become an OCT. The main reason for leaving is disagreements about the Common Fisheries Policy and to regain control of Greenlandic fish resources to subsequently remain outside EU waters.

Trade

In 2010, Greenland's exports to the EU amounted to €331 million (a 92.7% share of Greenland's total exports) and Greenland's imports from the EU were valued at €614 million (68.9% of all Greenland's imports). Exports to the EU were mainly food and live animals (89%). Imports from the EU included mineral fuels, lubricants (and related goods), machinery and transport equipment (together 47%). The EU is Greenland's main trading partner. However, Greenland ranks as the EU's 103rd largest trading partner.

In 2009 the EU Ban on Seal Products put in place an import ban on seal fur on grounds on animal cruelty, but made exemptions for Inuit communities in Greenland and Canada in order to protect indigenous way of life. The ban only allows small scale hunts for population control and local circulation – produce is not allowed to enter the EU. The ban angered those communities in the Arctic Circle who depend on sales from large scale seal hunting.  Exports of seal pelts in Greenland have dropped 90% in a few years - from 60 million DKK to DKK 6 million a year since 2006.

OCT status
Greenland is one of the Overseas Countries and Territories (OCT) of the EU due to its political relations to Denmark. As a result, Greenland has some integration with the EU's internal market via association agreements. It is also within the EU's common external tariff but they may charge customs in a non-discriminatory manner. Greenlandic citizens have EU citizenship. OCT nationals can be granted the right to vote for and participate in the election of the European Parliament, subject to the conditions defined by the related member states in compliance with Community law.

Up to 2006, all EU funds to Greenland (then €42.8 million per year) went via the EU–Greenland fishing agreement. Between 2007 and 2013, the EU provided €25 million per year outside of fishing. It has been given aid since it pulled out of the EU (see below) in 1985 to roughly the same amount it was previously receiving in EU structural funds (which it lost the right to receive due to its secession). This amounted to about 7% of Greenland's budget. The amount paid via the fishing agreement was in return for EU vessels fishing in Greenland's waters and to help restructure Greenland's fishing fleet. However, this deal was struck down by the European Court of Auditors, who felt the amount the EU was paying was too high for the quantity of fish caught.

OCTA
Greenland has joined the Association of the Overseas Countries and Territories of the European Union. It was founded on November 17, 2000, during the conference of prime ministers of overseas countries and territories in Brussels, Belgium. It includes almost all special member state territories of European Union whose purpose is to improve economic development in overseas countries and territories and cooperation with the European Union. It currently has 22 members. On 25 June 2008, a Cooperation Treaty between the EU and OCTA was signed in Brussels.

In 2012, Greenland and Prime Minister of Greenland, Kuupik Kleist, held the chairmanship of the organisation.

EU–Greenland partnership
Greenland is eligible for EU funding. Between 2007 and 2013, the EU allocated approximately €190 million, and between 2014 and 2020, €217.8 million are planned for sustainable development, with focus on education. In 2015, a joint declaration about closer relations between EU and Greenland was signed by Denmark, Greenland and the EU.

In March 2015, the President of the EU Commission, the Prime Minister of Denmark and the Greenland Premier signed  'an umbrella' framework document outlining EU-Greenland relations, a "Joint Declaration on relations between the European Union, on the one hand, and the Government of Greenland and the Government of Denmark, on the other". By this document, the EU confirms its long lasting links with Greenland and reiterates the geostrategic importance of Greenland for the EU.

The Brexit debate has reignited talk about the EU in Greenland, and there have been calls for the island to rejoin the Union.

Outside the EU
Greenland originally joined the then-European Community with Denmark in 1973. At that time Greenland had no autonomy from Denmark, which it gained in 1979. Greenland achieved some special treatment such as restrictions on business for non-residents and fisheries. Greenland got the right to one European Parliament member in the parliament election 1979.

Greenland left in 1985, following a referendum in 1982  with 53% voting for withdrawal after a dispute over fishing rights. The Greenland Treaty formalised their exit.

There has been some speculation as to whether Greenland might consider rejoining the European Union, although this seems highly unlikely to occur any time soon. On 4 January 2007, the Danish daily Jyllands-Posten quoted the former Danish minister for Greenland, Tom Høyem, as saying "I would not be surprised if Greenland again becomes a member of the EU ... The EU needs the Arctic window and Greenland cannot alone manage the gigantic Arctic possibilities". The debate has been reignited in light of the 2008–2011 Icelandic financial crisis. The EU Common Fisheries Policy is an important reason why Greenland, Norway and Iceland stay outside the EU. There was hope that the Icelandic negotiations on EU membership 2011–2013 could create an exception to the policy but the negotiations never got that far. "Gigantic Arctic possibilities" refers to natural resources such as mining. There is a very large iron deposit, Isua Iron Mine. Greenland can not finance the large cost of developing it and does not have such experience, so it has contracted a foreign company, which did not start to develop it because of low iron prices.

See also

Denmark and the European Union
Foreign relations of Greenland
Overseas Countries and Territories Association (OCTA)
Greenland Representation to the European Union
European Union
Arctic policy of the European Union
Special member state territories and the European Union (OCT)
Enlargement of the European Union
Greenland (European Parliament constituency)
Withdrawal of Greenland from the European Communities
1982 Greenlandic European Economic Community membership referendum
Accession of Iceland to the European Union
Norway–European Union relations

Further reading

 Christian Rebhan. 2016. North Atlantic Euroscepticism: the rejection of EU membership in the Faroe Islands and Greenland. Faroe University Press.
 Ulrik Pram Gad. 2016. National Identity Politics and Postcolonial Sovereignty Games: Greenland, Denmark, and the European Union. Museum Tusculanum Press.

References

External links
 European Union and Greenland at Department of Foreign Affairs of Greenland
 Greenland entry at European Commission
 Protocol (No 34) on special arrangements for Greenland at Official Journal of the European Union
 EU cooperation with Greenland at European Parliamentary Research Service

 
Politics of Greenland
Contemplated enlargements of the European Union
Foreign relations of Greenland
Politics of the European Union
Third-country relations of the European Union